Jennifer Okere (30 August 1968 – 28 June 1999) was a Nigerian actress and one of the pioneers of the Nigerian film industry (Nollywood) in the 1990s. Her two ground-breaking Nollywood blockbuster movies, Living in Bondage and Glamour Girls have been re-adapted. She was the posthumous recipient, of the 2016 Afro Heritage Broadcasting and Entertainment Awards (AHBEA) in Houston, Texas.

Early life
Jennifer Okere was born to the family of Chief Raymond Okere and Lolo Janet Okere in Okolochi, Owerri West, Imo State, Nigeria, where she lived through her teenage years. After completing her education, Okere moved to Lagos State with her family, where she entered the movie industry.

Career
After studying Theater Art at the University of Nigeria, Nsukka, Okere joined Nollywood in the early nineties. She made remarkable impacts in the industry with her ground-breaking movies Living in Bondage and Glamour Girls.

Movies
Okere played tremendous roles in her movies, especially her first movie Living in Bondage. The movie was a notable Igbo movie, starring Kenneth Okonkwo, Nnenna Nwabueze, Okechukwu Ogunjiofor, Francis Agu and Bob-Manuel Udokwu. Its two parts were released in 1992 and 1993, respectively.

The first movie she was featured, Living in Bondage had the cast: 
Kenneth Okonkwo as Andy Okeke
Nnenna Nwabueze as Merit, Andy's wife
Kanayo O. Kanayo as Chief Omego, cult member
Felicia Mayford as Obidia
Francis Agu as Ichie Million, cult member and Merit's boss
Okechukwu Ogunjiofor as Paul, Andy's friend and cult member
Ngozi Nwaneto as Caro, Merit's friend and Paul's girlfriend
Ngozi Nwosu as Ego, Andy's mistress
Chizoba Bosah as Merit's aunt
Bob-Manuel Udokwu as Mike, cult member
Sydney Diala as cult member/initiator
Daniel Oluigbo as cult chief priest 
Obiageli Molugbe as cult mother
Rita Nzelu as Tina, local prostitute
Jennifer Okere as Chinyere, Caro's friend
Ruth Osu as Andy and Merit's neighbour
Grace Ayozie as Andy's mother
Benjamin Nwosu as Andy's father
The makers of the movie first sold its right to Charles Okpaleke in 2015 for a possible remake. In 2015, Ramsey Nouah acquired the rights to Living In Bondage from Kenneth Nnebue, and filmed the remake in Europe, America, and Nigeria. Both Charles Okpaleke and Nouah's rights resulted to becoming a sequel titled Living in Bondage: Breaking Free.

Her second movie, Glamour Girls was starred by Liz Benson, Ngozi Ezeonu, Eucharia Anuobi, Pat Attah, Ernest Obi, Zack Orji, and others. On 12 December 2019, a Nigerian filmmaker Charles Okpaleke, acquired it for the lifetime copyrights of the 1994 for a modern remake. 

Okere also featured in Ikuku and True Confession. She also acted The Oath, The Ripples, Strange Woman, Calabash. The Oath was Okere's final movie.

Awards
In 1996, Okere received The Movie Award as the Best Igbo Actress after acting Ikuku (part 2). After her death, she was awarded The Afro Heritage Broadcasting and Entertainment Awards (AHBEA) in 2016, in Houston, Texas. The award was received by her husband, Emeka Ossai at the 2nd edition of the prestigious award. Been made popular by Living in Bondage, and Glamour Girls, brought about the recognition and celebration of her talents at The Afro Heritage Broadcasting and Entertainment Awards (AHBEA).

Death
Okere died in 1999, possibly from mistreatment by her husband, Emeka Ossai, and in-laws due to her delay in childbearing. She was buried in her hometown, Okolochi, and was mourned by her colleagues in the Nollywood industry, the majority of whom were present at her funeral. Her death was the first to shake Nollywood.

References

External links

 

20th-century Nigerian actresses
People from Imo State
1968 births
1999 deaths